Daniel Petit (born September 27, 1948 in Doische, Belgium) is a Canadian politician.

A lawyer by profession, Petit is a graduate of Université Laval and was called to the Quebec bar in 1973. He is a founder and partner of the firm Petit, Beaudoin, Société nominale d'avocats. Petit specialized in labour and administrative law and has organized for the Conservatives and the Progressive Conservatives since the 1980s.

He was first elected to the House of Commons of Canada in the 2006 federal election as the Conservative Member of Parliament for Charlesbourg—Haute-Saint-Charles. He defeated incumbent Bloc Québécois MP Richard Marceau to win the seat. In the 2011 election, he was defeated by Anne-Marie Day of the NDP.

He currently serves as the legal commission president of the Conservative Party of Quebec.

External links
 

1948 births
Belgian emigrants to Canada
Conservative Party of Canada MPs
Lawyers in Quebec
Living people
Members of the House of Commons of Canada from Quebec
People from Namur (province)
Politicians from Quebec City
Université Laval alumni
21st-century Canadian politicians